Danilo Montero (born 1 November 1962) is a Costa Rican contemporary Christian music singer, author, and pastor, who currently serves as pastor of Lakewood Church's Spanish-speaking congregation.

Biography 
Born on 1 November 1962, in San Jose, Costa Rica, he formed "Sígueme Internacional" in 1983 and began leading worship around the same time. A ministry as well as a musical production company, Sígueme organizes worship retreats internationally. He has recorded about 18 albums throughout his ministerial career that are part of the songs that are sung today in many Hispanic-speaking Protestant churches. He married Gloriana Diaz in April 2006. He converted to Christianity at the age of 14 when he was invited to the Great Campaign of Divine Healing annual meeting.

Montero has replaced Marcos Witt as the pastor for the Spanish-speaking ministry of Joel Osteen's Lakewood Church- Houston, Texas. He has written several Christian books such as "El Abrazo del Padre" and "Generación de Adoradores." He married Gloriana Diaz on 22 April 2006 in San José, Costa Rica, to a large number of witnesses and being present to Rev. Rey Matos, Raul Vargas, and Ricardo Salazar, pastor of the church "Vida Abundante". He led a ministry that won the 2008 Billboard Award for Latin music's best Christian music album with the song "Your Love."

He and his wife reside in Houston, Texas.

Discography
 Las Naciones Cantarán (1992)
 Celebra al Señor (1995)
 Admirable (1997)
 Eres Todopoderoso (1999)
 Cantare De Tu Amor (2001)
 Sígueme (2003)
 Lo Mejor De Danilo Montero (2003)
 Fortaleza (2004)
 Danilo En Vivo (desde Lima, Perú) (2005)
 Fortaleza (En Vivo) (2005)
 Eres Tú (2006)
 Tu Amor (2008)
 Devoción (2009)
 La Carta Perfecta (En Vivo) (2013)
 Mi Viaje (2018)
Mi Viaje (En Vivo) (2019)
 Encuentros (2020)

References

Performers of contemporary Christian music
Costa Rican performers of Christian music
Costa Rican male singers
Costa Rican Christians
1962 births
People from San José, Costa Rica
Spanish-language singers
Living people